Kim D. Issel (born September 25, 1967) is a former professional ice hockey right wing.  Issel was born in Regina, Saskatchewan, and spent his junior career with the Prince Albert Raiders of the WHL.  He was selected in the first round of the 1986 NHL Entry Draft, 21st overall, by the Edmonton Oilers.  Issel played four games for the Oilers, and was briefly part of the Pittsburgh Penguins and Vancouver Canucks minor league systems, but spent the majority of his career in Europe.  He officially announced his retirement on July 1, 1999 and works as a constable for Prince Albert Police Departement since then.

Awards 
WHL East Second All-Star Team (1986)

Career statistics

Regular season and playoffs

Notes

External links 

1967 births
Canadian ice hockey right wingers
Cape Breton Oilers players
Edmonton Oilers draft picks
Edmonton Oilers players
HDD Olimpija Ljubljana players
Sportspeople from Regina, Saskatchewan
Kansas City Blades players
Living people
National Hockey League first-round draft picks
Prince Albert Raiders players
Schwenninger Wild Wings players
Ice hockey people from Saskatchewan
Canadian expatriate ice hockey players in Slovenia
Canadian expatriate ice hockey players in Germany